24 may refer to:

 24 (number), the natural number following 23 and preceding 25
 one of the years 24 BC, AD 24, 1924, 2024

Film and television 
 24 frames per second, a common frame rate in film and television
 24 (TV series), an American show depicting the events of a single day in 24 real-time episodes per season
 24: Live Another Day, a 2014 limited series continuation of the original series
 24: Redemption, a 2008 television movie related to the television series
 24: The Game, a 2006 video game based on the television series
 24 (2001 film), a Czech thriller film
 24 (2016 film), an Indian Tamil film
 24 (soundtrack), the album of the 2016 Tamil film
 24 (Indian TV series), an Indian TV series based on the American show of the same name
 24 (Turkey), a Turkish television news channel

Music 

 24 (album), a compilation album by Christian group Point of Grace
 "24" (Game Theory song), on the 1985 album Real Nighttime
 "24" (Jem song), on the 2004 album Finally Woken
 "Twenty Four", a song by Karma to Burn from the album Appalachian Incantation, 2010
 "24" (Kanye West song), on the 2021 album Donda
 "24" (Money Man song), on the 2020 album Epidemic Deluxe
 "24", a song by Lana Del Rey on the 2015 album Honeymoon

Other uses 
 24 (puzzle), a mathematical card game

See also 
 Channel 24 (disambiguation)
 2/4 (disambiguation)
 24/7 (disambiguation)
 List of highways numbered 24